The Brothers Rocks are a group of rocks surrounded by foul ground lying  east of the north part of Saunders Island in the South Sandwich Islands. They were charted and named in 1930 by Discovery Investigations personnel on the RSS Discovery II.

References 

Rock formations of South Georgia and the South Sandwich Islands